Lost luggage is luggage conveyed by a public carrier such as an airline, seafaring cruise ship, shipping company, or railway which fails to arrive at the correct destination with the passenger. In the United States, an average of 1 in 150 people have their checked baggage misdirected or left behind each year.

Issues

Luggage is more likely to be lost or misdirected if the journey has several legs, as each transfer between different vehicles increases the chance that bags will be mishandled. There are many causes of lost luggage. If a passenger arrives late for a flight, there may not be time for their luggage to be loaded onto the plane. If tags are accidentally torn off, the airport may not know where to send the luggage. Human error is also common: tags may be misread or luggage may be sent to the wrong place. Occasionally, a plane may lack sufficient space or have reached its maximum takeoff weight. Security delays can also cause bags to arrive on a later flight than their owner. Luggage is taken through customs after its owner claims it.

Most lost luggage is quickly sent by the airline to the correct destination. Airlines will often reimburse passengers for toiletries, clothing, and other essentials if the arrival airport is away from the passenger's home area. In most cases, when delayed luggage arrives, a courier service will deliver it to the passenger's home or hotel. The airline usually pays for this.

In case of lost luggage, travelers are advised to carry all essentials in a carry-on bag, including a change of clothes and anything they would be greatly troubled to lose because of its monetary or emotional value (this excludes security restricted items, that can not be carried inside the passenger cabin). Occasionally luggage is completely lost and cannot be recovered. The airline will then normally compensate the owner. The passenger must then list the contents of their baggage and file a claim.

Bags can also be damaged during travel, but most damage (such as broken wheels and handles) is not covered under the airlines' contract of carriage. Some airlines, however, will still repair such damage as a good faith gesture, or offer a discount voucher for a future flight. In general airlines regard the purpose of luggage to be the protection of its contents during transit. If the luggage is damaged, even severely, but the contents are unharmed, then airlines regard the luggage as having fulfilled its purpose and will not compensate owners.

Compensation
Compensation for lost luggage is governed by the Montreal Convention and its predecessor the Warsaw Convention. Per the Montreal Convention, the maximum liability of an airline per lost checked item is 1131 special drawing rights (SDR), while under the Warsaw Convention the maximum liability is 17 SDR per kilogram.

Unclaimed baggage center
Most airlines maintain stores where they sell the contents of lost or abandoned luggage. If a baggage is never recovered, it is usually because it has been mistaken by another passenger as his or her own baggage. Alternatively it could have been stolen either by another passenger or an airport employee (perhaps with an accomplice).

In 2004, a baggage handler at Baltimore-Washington International Airport was arrested for the theft of mail sent by airplane, including credit cards.

The majority of unclaimed baggage in the United States, whether by being lost or misdirected, or simply forgotten by travelers, is handled by the Unclaimed Baggage Center in Scottsboro, Alabama, which has contracts with most major airlines. Eventually, the luggage sent to UBC is resold for a profit.

Statistics
The U.S. Department of Transportation maintains air travel consumer reports, which include statistics on mishandled baggage. For the first quarter of 2017, Virgin America was ranked first for reports of lost luggage with 1.45 reports per 1,000 passengers.

Rates for lost luggage decreases year after year, due to the constant efforts made by the airlines. The handling market is $2.74 billion in 2013 and is expected to grow by 2.1% until 2023. After a significant decrease in the first decade of 2000, number of lost luggage cannot drop much more again, or at the margin only. There is now under 3‰ luggage lost per 1,000 passengers carried on US domestic flights.

See also
Okoban

References

External links 
 

Civil aviation
Luggage